Yegorovka is a rural locality (a village) in Bazlyksky Selsoviet, Bizhbulyaksky District, Bashkortostan, Russia. The population was 64 as of 2010. There is 1 street.

Geography 
Yegorovka is located 14 km northeast of Bizhbulyak (the district's administrative centre) by road. Musino is the nearest rural locality.

References 

Rural localities in Bizhbulyaksky District